In chemistry and related fields, the molar volume, symbol Vm, or  of a substance is the ratio of the volume occupied by a substance to the amount of substance, usually given at a given temperature and pressure. It is equal to the molar mass (M) divided by the mass density (ρ):

The molar volume has the SI unit of cubic metres per mole (m3/mol), although it is more typical to use the units cubic decimetres per mole (dm3/mol) for gases, and cubic centimetres per mole (cm3/mol) for liquids and solids.

Definition

The molar volume of a substance i is defined as its molar mass divided by its density ρi0:

For an ideal mixture containing N components, the molar volume of the mixture is the weighted sum of the molar volumes of its individual components. For a real mixture the molar volume cannot be calculated without knowing the density:

There are many liquid–liquid mixtures, for instance mixing pure ethanol and pure water, which may experience contraction or expansion upon mixing. This effect is represented by the quantity excess volume of the mixture, an example of excess property.

Relation to specific volume 
Molar volume is related to specific volume by the product with molar mass. This follows from above where the specific volume is the reciprocal of the density of a substance:

Ideal gases 
For ideal gases, the molar volume is given by the ideal gas equation; this is a good approximation for many common gases at standard temperature and pressure.
The ideal gas equation can be rearranged to give an expression for the molar volume of an ideal gas:

The molar volume of an ideal gas at 100 kPa (1 bar) is
 at 0 °C,
 at 25 °C.
The molar volume of an ideal gas at 1 atmosphere of pressure is
 at 0 °C,
 at 25 °C.

Crystalline solids 
For crystalline solids, the molar volume can be measured by X-ray crystallography.
The unit cell volume (Vcell) may be calculated from the unit cell parameters, whose determination is the first step in an X-ray crystallography experiment (the calculation is performed automatically by the structure determination software). This is related to the molar volume by

where NA is the Avogadro constant and Z is the number of formula units in the unit cell. The result is normally reported as the "crystallographic density".

Molar volume of silicon 

Ultra-pure silicon is routinely made for the electronics industry, and the measurement of the molar volume of silicon, both by X-ray crystallography and by the ratio of molar mass to mass density, has attracted much attention since the pioneering work at NIST in 1974. The interest stems from that accurate measurements of the unit cell volume, atomic weight and mass density of a pure crystalline solid provide a direct determination of the Avogadro constant.

See also 
 Specific volume

References

External links 
 Interactive table of molar volumes

Volume